Mac Domhnaill Fhinn Ua Dubhda (died 1136) was King of Ui Fiachrach Muaidhe.

Annalistic reference

 1136. The son of Domhnall Ua Dubhda, lord of Ui-Amhalghadha, was killed.

External links

 http://www.ucc.ie/celt/published/T100005B/

References

 The History of Mayo, Hubert T. Knox, p. 379, 1908.

People from County Sligo
Monarchs from County Mayo
12th-century Irish monarchs